Federal elections were held in Switzerland on 29 October 1905. The Free Democratic Party retained its majority in the National Council.

Electoral system
The 167 members of the National Council were elected in 49 single- and multi-member constituencies using a three-round system. Candidates had to receive a majority in the first or second round to be elected; if it went to a third round, only a plurality was required. Voters could cast as many votes as there were seats in their constituency. There was one seat for every 20,000 citizens, with seats allocated to cantons in proportion to their population.

Results
Voter turnout was highest in Schaffhausen (where voting was compulsory) at 96% and lowest in Zug at 20%.

By constituency

References

1905
Switzerland
1905 in Switzerland
October 1905 events
Federal